Juan José Castilla (born 7 April 1945) is a Mexican modern pentathlete. He competed at the 1972 Summer Olympics.

References

1945 births
Living people
Mexican male modern pentathletes
Olympic modern pentathletes of Mexico
Modern pentathletes at the 1972 Summer Olympics